Jean-Baptiste Rampignon (15 May 1900 – 13 June 1923) was a French boxer who competed in the 1920 Summer Olympics. In 1920 he was eliminated in the quarter-finals of the flyweight class after losing his fight to the upcoming gold medalist Frankie Genaro.

References

External links

Jean-Baptiste Rampignon's profile at Sports Reference.com

1900 births
1923 deaths
Flyweight boxers
Olympic boxers of France
Boxers at the 1920 Summer Olympics
French male boxers